Harold Thompson may refer to:
 Harold E. Thompson (1921–2003), American helicopter aviation pioneer
 Harold H. Thompson (anarchist) (1942–2008), American anarchist, anti-Vietnam war activist, author, and prisoner advocate
 Harold Warris Thompson (1908–1983), English physical chemist, Chairman of the Football  Association 
 Harold William Thompson (1891–1964), American folklorist and historian
 H. Keith Thompson (1922–2002), American corporate executive and far right figure

See also
 Harry Thompson (disambiguation)
 Harold Thomas (disambiguation)